Dmitry Kiselyov may refer to:

 Dmitri Kiselev, Russian ice dancer
 Dmitrii Kiselev, Russian handball player
 Dmitry Kiselyov, Russian television presenter
 Dmitry Kiselyov (film director)